Pseudotaxalus is a genus of longhorn beetles of the subfamily Lamiinae, containing the following species:

 Pseudotaxalus alboguttatus Breuning, 1939
 Pseudotaxalus angustus (Gahan, 1894)

References

Pteropliini